Sullivan M. Cutcheon (October 4, 1833 – April 18, 1900) was a Michigan politician, lawyer, and banker.

Early life
Cutcheon was born on October 4, 1833, in Pembroke, New Hampshire, to Reverend James and Hannah M. Cutcheon.

Career
Cutcheon was admitted to the bar in 1860. Cutcheon served as a member of the Michigan House of Representatives from the Washtenaw County 1st district from 1861 to 1864. During his last term, he served as the Speaker of the Michigan House of Representatives. Cutcheon was a delegate to the Republican National Convention from Michigan in 1868. Cutcheon was the United States Attorney for the Eastern District of Michigan from 1877 to 1885. Cutcheon was the president of multiple banks over the course of his life, the Dime Savings Bank in 1884 and the Ypsilanti Savings Bank in 1892.

Personal life
Cutcheon married Josephine Louise Moore on December 8, 1859. Together, they had two children. Cutcheon was Presbyterian.

Death
Cutcheon died on April 18, 1900, in Ypsilanti, Michigan. He is interred at Woodlawn Cemetery in Detroit.

References

1833 births
1900 deaths
Speakers of the Michigan House of Representatives
Republican Party members of the Michigan House of Representatives
Presbyterians from Michigan
19th-century Presbyterians
Burials at Woodlawn Cemetery (Detroit)
United States Attorneys for the Eastern District of Michigan
19th-century American politicians
19th-century American lawyers